Choi Sung-won is a Korean name consisting of the family name Choi and the given name Sung-won, and may also refer to:

 Choi Sung-won (musician) (born 1954), South Korean musician
 Choi Sung-won (billiards player) (born 1977), South Korean billiards player
 Choi Sung-won (actor) (born 1985), South Korean actor